Wasim Khan (born 3 February 1978) is a Pakistani cricketer. He played in 82 first-class and 59 List A matches between 2001 and 2012. He made his Twenty20 debut on 25 April 2005, for Lahore Lions in the 2004–05 National Twenty20 Cup.

References

External links
 

1978 births
Living people
Pakistani cricketers
Lahore Lions cricketers
Lahore Whites cricketers
National Bank of Pakistan cricketers
Sui Northern Gas Pipelines Limited cricketers
Place of birth missing (living people)